George Leake (1786–1849) was a wealthy landholder in the early days of the Swan River Colony. Backed with considerable assets, Leake supported many of the early settlers of the colony who were struggling financially.

Biography

Early life
George Leake was born in 1786 in London, England. His father was Luke Leake, and his mother, Ann (née Heading, 1758–1836).

Career
He was instrumental in the establishment of the first Bank of Western Australia which was established in June 1837, becoming its first chairman of directors. In 1839, he was one of four unofficial nominees of the Western Australian Legislative Council, retaining his seat until his death.  He was appointed magistrate in 1839 and was made chairman of the Perth Town Trust (later to become Perth City Council).

Personal life
He married Anne Growse, who died in 1815 leaving him with one daughter, Ann Elizabeth.

His nephew, George Walpole Leake, was a prominent Western Australian barrister and magistrate and father of George Leake, Premier of Western Australia from 1901 to 1902.

Death
He died in 1849 in Perth, Western Australia.

See also
 Members of the Western Australian Legislative Council, 1832–1870
 Leake family tree

Notes

References
M. Medcalf, 'Leake, George (1786 - 1849)', Australian Dictionary of Biography, Volume 2, Melbourne University Press, 1967, pp 99–100.
Dictionary of Australian Biography entry of his grandson, George Leake (Premier)

Further reading
 Chapman, Jenny.(1965) Perserverando : the Leake family in the political, economic and social life of W.A., 1829-1902, with particular reference to George Leake (1786-1849), Sir Luke Samuel Leake (1828-1886), and George Leake (1856-1902) held in Battye Library.

1786 births
1849 deaths
Settlers of Western Australia
Businesspeople from London
English emigrants to Australia
Economic history of Western Australia
Members of the Western Australian Legislative Council
Mayors and Lord Mayors of Perth, Western Australia
Burials at East Perth Cemeteries
19th-century British businesspeople
19th-century Australian politicians